In zoological nomenclature, an available name  is a scientific name for a taxon of animals that has been published conforming to all the mandatory provisions of the International Code of Zoological Nomenclature for the establishment of a zoological name.

For a name to be available, there are a number of general requirements it must fulfill: it must use only the Latin alphabet, be published in a timely fashion by a reputable source, etc. In some rare cases, a name which does not meet these requirements may nevertheless be available, for historical reasons.

All available names must refer to a type.  For species-level names, the type is a specimen (a holotype or lectotype); for generic-level names, the type is a species name; for family-level names, the type is a genus name.  This hierarchical system of typification provides a concrete empirical anchor for all zoological names. 

An available name is not necessarily a valid name, because an available name may be in synonymy. However, a valid name must always be an available one.

Contrast to botany
Under the International Code of Nomenclature for algae, fungi, and plants, this term is not used. In botany, the corresponding term is validly published name. The botanical equivalent of zoology's term "valid name" is correct name.

References

Zoological nomenclature